Muricopsis annobonensis is a species of sea snail, a marine gastropod mollusk in the family Muricidae, the murex snails or rock snails.

Distribution
This marine species occurs in West Africa. The type locality is the island of Annobón, Gulf of Guinea.

References

 Houart, R.; Rolán, E. (2001). A new Muricopsis (Gastropoda, Muricidae) from Annobón Island, Eastern Atlantic. Novapex (Jodoigne) 2(2): 61-66

Muricidae
Fauna of Annobón
Endemic fauna of Equatorial Guinea
Gastropods described in 2001